Her Soul's Song is a 1916 American silent short film directed by Lloyd B. Carleton. The film is based on a story by Betty Schade. Calder Johnstone developed the screenplay. This drama's features Dorothy Davenport and Emory Johnson.

The story involves an opera singer who marries, then loses her voice after the couple's baby is born. The event causes her to resent the newborn, and she abandons both her husband and baby. Later she returns when the child is ill. The baby makes a miraculous recovery, and the singer regains her voice and her happiness.

The film was released on June 15, 1916, by Universal.

Plot
Mary Salsbury and Paul Chandos live in the small city. Paul is trying to become a prosperous business owner, and Mary wants to become a professional singer. Mary loves Paul, and the two seem destined to wed. Finally, Paul asks Mary to be his wife. Faced with a significant life decision, Mary tells Paul she cannot marry until she finds if her voice can make her a star. She declines Paul's proposal and moves to the big city to have her voice professionally developed.

Five years past, Paul's businesses have flourished, and he has become highly successful. Along with friends, Paul attends a concert by a famous singer. He discovers the singer is no other than Mary, now an established star named Valeria Salsbury. They reconnect and start seeing each other. Their many dates rekindle Paul's love for Valeria, and he proposes again. She consents this time with one huge caveat. Anytime Valeria wishes to return to the stage, he must support her. Paul agrees to the stipulation, and they married.

One year later, Valeria gives birth to a baby girl. Though delighted, she finds out the birth has caused her to lose her singing voice. She makes a doctor's appointment, but after a close examination, the physician tells her she will never sing again. As the days pass, she becomes sullen, blaming the child for losing her singing voice.

Valeria discovers there is a prominent doctor in Europe treating conditions like hers. With melancholia overwhelming her life, she tells Paul she needs to go to Europe to see this famous doctor. Paul tells her she is wasting time away from the family since there is no treatment for her condition. They have a heated exchange, and she leaves for Europe, leaving behind the baby in Paul's care.

After arriving in Europe, she visits the clinic. The physicians advise her there is no cure for her condition. They suggest she should focus on caring for her husband and baby. Despondent, she heads back to her hotel room. She has a dream after she falls asleep; her baby is sick and needs her care. Then she has an epiphany. It occurs to her; she has given up everything for a medical issue that has no cure. She rushes back to the states to be with her baby.

When she returns, she finds her baby is seriously ill. Since their last roe, Paul is hesitant to let her see the baby. In fact, he blames her for the child's illness since the baby lacked a mother's care. He relents and allows her to see her daughter while a physician is present. She asks the doctor if there is any hope for the baby's recovery. The doctor tells her there is none. She must hold her child close and say her last goodbyes. She becomes hysterical and screams; nobody will take her child. The baby cries, and to soothe the infant, she hums a lullaby.

Suddenly it occurs to her—how is she able to hum a lullaby? Has her voice returned? It's a miracle her voice has returned. She hugs her baby even closer. Paul glances at her sadly, understanding there is nothing they can do for the poor baby. She sings to the baby all night long. The next morning, the doctor arrives, fully expecting the worst but discovering the baby is much better. After an examination, the doctor declares the baby has made a miraculous recovery and should recover fully. He has no explanation for the turnabout, except a mother's devotion can work wonders. Paul reconciles with Mary, and they live happily ever after.

Cast

Production

Pre-production

Development
According to the book - The Universal Story, Carl Laemmle (1867-1939) produced around 91 movies in 1916.
Lloyd B. Carleton (–1933) started working for Carl Laemmle in the Fall of 1915. Carleton arrived with impeccable credentials, having directed some 60 films for the likes of Thanhouser, Lubin, Fox, and Selig. 
Between March and December 1916, -year-old Lloyd Carleton directed 16 movies for Universal, starting with The Yaqui and ending with The Morals of Hilda. Emory Johnson acted in all 16 of these films. Of Carleton's total 1916 output, 11 were feature films, and the rest were two-reel shorts.

In 1916, Carleton directed all 13 films pairing Dorothy Davenport and Emory Johnson. This film would be the fifth in the 13-film series. These totals show Carl Laemmle was clearly giving the Davenport-Johnson pairing one of his elite directors from the working cadre of universal directors to produce the screen chemistry Laemmle was seeking.

Casting
Dorothy Davenport (1895-1977) was an established star for Universal when the  year-old actress played the Mary Salsbury. She had acted in hundreds of movies by the time she starred in this film. The majority of these films were 2-reel shorts, as was the norm in Hollywood's teen years. She had been making movies since 1910. She started dating Wally Reid when she was barely 16, and he was 20. They married in 1913. After her husband died in 1923, she used the name "Mrs. Wallace Reid" in the credits for any project she took part in. Besides being an actress, she would eventually become a film director, producer, and writer.
Emory Johnson (1894-1960) was  years old when he acted in this movie as Paul Chandos. In January 1916, Emory signed a contract with Universal Film Manufacturing Company. Carl Laemmle of Universal Film Manufacturing Company thought he saw great potential in Johnson, so he chooses him to be Universal's new leading man. Laemmle's hope was Johnson would become another Wallace Reed. A major part of his plan was to create a movie couple that would sizzle on the silver screen. Laemmle thought Dorothy Davenport and Emory Johnson could create the chemistry he sought. Johnson and Davenport would complete 13 films together. They started with the successful feature production of Doctor Neighbor in May 1916 and ended with The Devil's Bondwoman in November 1916. After completing the last movie, Laemmle thought Johnson did not have the screen presence he wanted. He decided not to renew his contract. Johnson would make 17 movies in 1916, including 6 shorts and 11 feature-length Dramas. 1916 would become the second-highest movie output of his entire acting career. Emory acted in 25 films for Universal, mostly dramas with a sprinkling of comedies and westerns.
Virginia Kerrigan, otherwise known as Baby Kerrigan (1915-1924), was a 5-months-old when she featured as the baby in this film. Baby Kerrigan was born Virginia Richdale Kerrigan on November 4, 1915, to Universal film executive William Wallace Kerrigan and Nina Richdale. She was the niece of the actor J. Warren Kerrigan and his sister actress Kathleen Kerrigan. She earned $5.00 per day making films for universal. At one time, she was the youngest featured player in the world. She was noted for the fact she never cries. She would be cast next in In His Service, released as Good and Evil in August 1916. She died a tragic death 9 years later in Los Angeles on December 27, 1924.

Screenplay
Betty Schade (1895-1982) was  years-old when she created this story. A Motion Picture News article stated "She is fond of reading, music and tennis. She has written several scenarios including Her Soul's Song."
Calder Johnstone (1880–1958) was  years-old when he wrote the scenario for this film.

Filming

Alternate title
Based on an article in the Motion Picture News dated May 13, 1916 the working title for this film was The Double Sacrifice.

Post production

Based on an American Film Institute standard, films with a running time of forty minutes or longer are considered feature films.
By 1915, feature films were starting to become more the trend in Hollywood. While advertising this film, a Universal ad is shown in the graphic, also expounds on short films.

The moving picture business is here to stay. That you must admit despite carping critics and blundering sore-heads. True, some exhibitors have found business so good lately — but if you get down to facts when you look for the reason why, it's a 100 to 1 shot that they are, and for some time have been, dallying with a feature program. Some of these wise ones will tell you that business has picked up since they went into features, — BUT — ask them whether they are talking NET or GROSS. They will find they have an immediate appointment and terminate your queries unceremoniously. Funny how we like to kid ourselves, isn't it? The man who is packing 'em in and losing money on features is envied by his competitor, who is laying by a bit every day, and has a good steady, dependable patronage but admits to a few vacant seats at some performances. When this chap wakes up, he will realize that he has a gold mine and that good advertising will make it produce to capacity. The moral is that if you can tie up to the Universal Program, DO IT. If you can't NOW, watch your first chance. Let the people know what you have, and let the feature man go on to ruin if he wants to. You should worry!

Studios
The movie was filmed at the studio complex at Universal Studios located at 100 Universal City Plaza in Universal City, California.

Release and reception

Official release
The copyright was filed with U.S. Copyright Office and entered into the record as shown:
HER SOUL'S SONG. 1916 2 reels.
Credits: Producer, L B. Carleton; story
Betty Schade; scenario, Calder Johnstone.
© Universal Film Mfg. Co., Inc.; 6 Jun 16;
LP8439
This film was officially released on June 15, 1916.

Advertising
In 1916, full-page ads were not de rigueur for short films. A short synopsis was more the standard, along with a few half-page descriptions of the film's plot. Shown below is a quote from a Universal advertisement placed in Motion Picture News promoting this film along with several others:

Her Soul's Song With Dorothy Davenport and Emory Johnson. The stars of this beautiful little drama have shown what they could do in heavy emotional work time and again. This story of an opera singer who gave up her career for love and who lost her voice when the baby came; who regained it under the most peculiar conditions, is so absorbingly human that it is positively universal in its appeal to the finer emotions of the heart. Abounding in heartthrobs, it will please any audience.

The newspaper ad showed Her Soul's Song playing along with two other films. The other films are:
Thomas Jefferson and Lina Basquette starring the one-reel drama Brother Jim.
Matt Moore and Jane Gail starring the one-reel comedy A Double Fire Deception.

Referencing "The Universal Program" detailed above, this is an example of a "diversified program."

Reviews
Lengthy detailed reviews for short films were rare. The Hollywood magazines primarily reviewed feature films and only gave short films honorable mention. Of course, in 1916, movie magazines were evolving and becoming more sophisticated like the movies they checked and advertised.

Critical response
In the June 17, 1916 issue of The Moving Picture World, the movie staff reviewed the film:
The story is a good one and is given a fine presentation. The ornamented title and subtitles are decidedly artistic, and the two principals are pleasing. The baby also shares the honors, being uncommonly attractive.

In the June 17, 1916 issue of The Moving Picture World, under the section - Tabloid Reviews for the Busy Exhibitor:
This drama, though seemingly wildly impossible, makes very good entertainment. The subtitles are written across the scenes in most instances. Dorothy Davenport and Emory Johnson are the principals.

Preservation status

A report created by film historian and archivist David Pierce for the Library of Congress claims:
75% of original silent-era films have perished.
14% of the 10,919 silent films released by major studios exist in their original 35mm or other formats.
11% survive in full-length foreign versions or on film formats of lesser image quality. Many silent-era films did not survive for reasons as explained on this Wikipedia page.

According to the Library of Congress, all known copies of this film are lost.

Gallery

References

External links
Katchmer, George A. A Biographical Dictionary of Silent Film Western Actors and Actresses, McFarland, 2002, p. 204.
Holmstrom, John. The Moving Picture Boy: An International Encyclopaedia from 1895 to 1995, Norwich, Michael Russell, 1996.
List of Universal Pictures films (1912–1919)
Universal Pictures
List of American films of 1916

1916 lost films
1916 drama films
1916 films
American black-and-white films
American silent short films
Lost American films
Silent American drama films
Universal Pictures short films
Films directed by Lloyd B. Carleton
1910s English-language films
1910s American films